Richland Parish is a parish located in the North Louisiana Delta Country in the U.S. state of Louisiana, known for its fertile, flat farmland, cane brakes, and open spaces. The parish had a population of 20,043 at the 2020 United States Census. The name Richland was chosen due to the rich production from farming. The parish seat and largest community is Rayville.

History
The parish was officially created on September 29, 1868. Rayville, Louisiana, the parish seat, was named for John Ray, a politician from Monroe with large land holdings in present-day Rayville.

Richland Parish is home to the first public parish library in the State of Louisiana, the Rhymes Memorial Library. The library was built in 1925 by the Lambda Kappa Club of Rayville. R.R. Rhymes donated the original building in memory of his wife, Nonnie Roark Rhymes.

Geography
Bayou Macon flows through the western areas of Richland. Other tributaries in the parish include Crew Lake, and the Lafourche Diversion Canal are located in the western portion of the parish. Boeuf River flows from the northern end to the southern end in the center of the parish.

Adjacent parishes 
 Morehouse Parish (north)
 West Carroll Parish (northeast)
 Madison Parish (east)
 Franklin Parish (south)
 Caldwell Parish (southwest)
 Ouachita Parish (west)

Parks and wildlife management areas
 Poverty Point Reservoir State Park
 Russell Sage Wildlife Management Area
 Floy Ward McElroy Wildlife Management Area

Transportation

Demographics

2020 census

As of the 2020 United States census, there were 20,043 people, 7,459 households, and 4,972 families residing in the parish.

Education

Public schools
 Delhi Elementary
 Delhi Junior High
 Delhi High School
 Holli Ridge Elementary
 Mangham Elementary
 Mangham Junior High
 Mangham High School
 Rayville Elementary
 Rayville Junior High
 Rayville, High School
 Start Elementary

Private schools
 Riverfield Academy, K-12

Charter schools
 Delhi Charter, K-12

Community and technical colleges
 Louisiana Delta Community College, (with campus locations in neighboring Tallulah, Winnsboro, Lake Providence, Bastrop, Monroe, and West Monroe.)

Regional universities
 University of Louisiana at Monroe
 Louisiana Tech University, (Ruston)
 Grambling State University, (Grambling)

Communities

Towns 
 Delhi
 Rayville (parish seat and largest municipality)

Village
 Mangham

Unincorporated areas

Census-designated place 
 Start

Unincorporated communities 

 Alto
 Archibald
 Bardel
 Bee Bayou
 Buckner
 Charlieville
 Crew Lake
 Dehlco
 Dunn
 Four Forks
 Gilleyville
 Girard
 Holly Ridge
 Jonesburg
 Mitchiner
 New Light
 Rhymes
 Sacksonia
 Warden

Government

Notable people
 Julia Letlow, from Start, elected Member of Congress in the United States House of Representatives.
 Luke Letlow, from Start, elected to the United States House of Representatives, but died of a heart attack caused by COVID-19 before he could be seated.
 Ralph Abraham, from Alto, elected Member of Congress in United States House of Representatives. 
 Harry W. Addison was a Southern author and humorist who resided in Rayville from 1945 to 1957.
 Jamar Adcock, a politician and banker in Monroe, born in Richland Parish
 Benny Gay Christian, state representative for Richland Parish, 1964 to 1974.
 Terry Doughty, is a federally appointed judge for the Western District of Louisiana.
 George B. Franklin, Jr., was a prominent planter, philanthropist, and conservationist.
 Elvin Hayes, NBA Hall of Fame basketball player, born in Rayville
 Arlene Howell, Miss Louisiana USA 1958, Miss USA 1958
 Fred W. Jones, Jr., city, district, and state court judge, born in Rayville; resided in Ruston, Louisiana
 Ralph E. King, Winnsboro physician who represented Richland Parish in the Louisiana State Senate from 1944 to 1952 and again from 1956 to 1960
 William L. Kirk, of Rayville was a United States Air Force four-star general who served as Commander in Chief, U.S. Air Forces in Europe/Commander, Allied Air Forces Central Europe.
 Ernie Ladd, a football player/professional wrestler, born in Rayville
 Moses J. Liddell was appointed by President Grover Cleveland as a judge for the Supreme Court of the Montana Territory.
 Wiley Person Mangham, an American publisher and editor. He is the namesake for the town of Mangham, Louisiana
 Charles McConnell, politician in Springhill, Louisiana; a native of Richland Parish
 Keith Munyan, Jr., commercial photographer in North Hollywood, California
 Tim McGraw, Country musician, born in Delhi, and raised in Start
 Darryl Riser, editor of the Delhi Dispatch and Richland Beacon-News and, formerly, the Richland Journal
 Robert Max Ross, was a Republican politician and activist who qualified to run for Governor, U.S. Senate, and the U.S. House, for the purpose of advancing the two-party system in Louisiana, at a time it did not exist.
 Francis C. Thompson served in the Louisiana House of Representatives from 1975 until 2008; since in the Louisiana State Senate

Gallery

Politics

See also

 National Register of Historic Places listings in Richland Parish, Louisiana

References

External links
 Richland Parish Chamber of Commerce
 Richland Parish Assessor's Office

 
Louisiana parishes
1868 establishments in Louisiana
Populated places established in 1868